Chiaroscuro was a horror series which appeared in  the British weekly comic 2000 AD. It was written by Simon Spurrier with art by Cam Smith (also known as Smudge).

Characters 
Anthony Elvy is a film journalist and the son of a once famous film director. He is sick of the fake sincerity that surrounds the film industry.
Samuel Erin is a seventy-year-old film director who is full of self-pity. He hands Elvy a film reel before he is killed in an accident.

Plot 
London 2006. Anthony Elvy heads to Elstree Film and Television Studios to do an on set interview with a film director by the name of Samuel Erin. During the interview, it is discovered that Erin is full of self-pity. At the end of the interview, he hands Elvy a film reel telling him it will be what he is best known for. Elvy decides to head home early to watch the reel. Elvy discovers, to his horror, that its actually a Mondo film showing US troops executing Cubans during Operation Urgent Fury in Grenada, 1983. He phones Erin for another interview but he is lying dead, impaled on a prop set and surrounded by fire.

See also

Ancient Images a 1989 novel by Ramsey Campbell with a similar theme
The Grin in the Dark by Ramsey Campbell that deals with the horrors of a silent film and actor.
Flicker (1991), a novel by Theodore Roszak
Faces of Death, one of the most famous Mondo films

External links
 2000 AD profile

British comics
Horror comics
2000 AD comic strips
2006 comics debuts